Fracchia la belva umana (Fracchia the fanatic or Fracchia The Human Beast) is a 1981 Italian comedy film directed by Neri Parenti. The film is loosely inspired by The Whole Town's Talking. It was screened at the 67th Venice International Film Festival as an Italian comedy.  Its cast includes: Paolo Villaggio, Lino Banfi and the then young Massimo Boldi and Francesco Salvi.

Plot
Due to misfortune, Giandomenico Fracchia (an employee in a chocolate factory) ends up becoming a body double of a terrible criminal known as "the human beast": which leads into  series of problems and misunderstandings for him.

Cast
 Paolo Villaggio as Giandomenico Fracchia / La Belva Umana
 Lino Banfi as Commissario Auricchio
 Anna Mazzamauro as Miss Corvino
 Francesco Salvi as Neuro
 Sandro Ghiani as De Simone
 Antonio Allocca as Carabinieri's Marshal
 Jole Silvani as Palmira (as Iole Silvani)
 Fiammetta Baralla as chubby girl doing jogging
 Ugo Bologna as bank director
 Giulio Farnese as afterworld's gatekeeper
 Renzo Rinaldi as Carabinieri's Colonel
 Renato Cecchetto as DIGOS' Chief
 Roberto Della Casa as Tino
 Massimo Boldi as Pera
 Gigi Reder as The Human Beast's mother

Production
It was the first of the two films about Fracchia, a character created by Paolo Villaggio, along with the most famous Ugo Fantozzi. Despite being published six years after Fantozzi, and pulling many gags from Fantozzi's movies, the film was a success and became a cult movie. Many gags from the movie became famous (IE the sit on the pouf) and defined the typical repertoire of Paolo Villaggio (right in this film was introduced at the cinema the famous joke  «Com'è umano lei!» («How humane you are!») was first born on TV).
 
Among the characters the noteworthy performances are: Gigi Reder who plays the mother of "The Human Beast" and  Anna Mazzamauro  who plays the lover of "The Human Beast"  (whose love is not reciprocate by Fracchia). Honorary mentions are: two youth Massimo Boldi and Francesco Salvi playing as accomplices of "The Human Beast". Memorables scenes are the gags between the Chief of Police Commissario Auricchio (Lino Banfi) and his subordinante Appuntato De Simone (Sandro Ghiani).

References

External links

1981 films
1981 comedy films
Italian comedy films
1980s Italian-language films
Films set in Rome
Films directed by Neri Parenti
Films about identity theft
Films scored by Fred Bongusto
1980s Italian films